Ki or KI may refer to:

Arts and entertainment

Music

Albums
 Ki (Devin Townsend Project album), 2009
 Ki (Kitaro album), 1979

Songs
 "Ki", a song from the album "Minecraft - Volume Beta" by C418

Businesses and organizations
 Klaksvíkar Ítróttarfelag, a Faroese semi-professional football club
 Communist Initiative, Marxist–Leninist organization in Austria
 Karolinska Institute, Swedish university
 Kenyon Institute, a British research institute in Jerusalem
 Adam Air (2002–2008), an Indonesian airline 
 Kiwanis International, service club

Language
 Ki language, a Southern Bantoid language of Cameroon
 Ki (kana), a Japanese syllabic character
 Ki (cuneiform), a sign in cuneiform writing
 Gikuyu language, ISO 639-1 code:ki

Names
 Ki (Korean surname), a Korean surname
 Ki or Qi (surname)
 Ki or Ji (surname)

Places
 Kangaroo Island, Australia
 Ki Monastery, in India
Kiawah Island, South Carolina, United States
 Kings Island, Ohio, United States, amusement park owned by Cedar Fair Entertainment Company
 Kiribati
 .ki, the ISO 3166-1 alpha-2 country code top level domain for Kiribati
Kitchenuhmaykoosib Inninuwug First Nation

Religion and metaphysics
 Ki (goddess)
 Qi, or ki in Japanese, a vital force according to Chinese culture that forms part of any living thing

Science and technology

Biology and chemistry
 Ti (plant), also called Kī
 Ki, an equilibrium constant for a chemical reaction or process "i":
dissociation constant applicable to process, abbreviated as "i".
 a measure of the binding affinity of a ligand to a biomolecule
 Potassium iodide, chemical formula KI
 Gene knockin or Knock-in, a genetic engineering method
 Ki Database, a database of biochemical information

Computing
 Ki (prefix symbol), the prefix symbol of the binary unit prefix kibi
 Ki, International Electrotechnical Commission standard symbol for number 1024
 K-I algorithm, Kittler and Illingworth iterative algorithm for image segmentation thresholding
 Ki (or Ki), the unique cryptographic key of each cell phone's SIM card

Other uses

 Knowledge integration, in epistemology
 Grover C. Winn (1886–1943), nicknamed "Ki", American lawyer and politician